Pyotr Petrovich Bulakhov (Петр Петрович Булахов; 1822 in Moscow – 2 December 1885 in Kuskovo) was a Russian composer.

His father: singer Pyotr Alexandrovich Bulakhov (ru: Петр Александрович Булахов, (1793?–1837), his brother: singer and composer Pavel Petrovich Bulakhov (ru: Павел Петрович Булахов, 1824–1875).

His daughter was the opera singer Yevgeniya Ivanovna Zbruyeva (1867?–1936). (the composer did not formally issue a religious marriage with his wife, so both their daughters were officially daughters of their mothers first husband and were under his name.)

His song "You Will Not Believe" ("Ты не поверишь") was set as piano transcriptions by Franz Liszt (Chanson Bohemienne S.250/2), Adolf von Henselt (Fantaisie sur un Air Bohémien-Russe, Op 16) and Ferdinand Beyer (Hommage à la Russie, Op.100 No. 9).

Works
His many popular songs include:
 Shine, Shine, My Star
 Do Not Awaken Memories
 Don't Wake Me Up
 I Met You
 In the Wide-Open Field
 A dainty mouth pursed in anger
 No, I Do Not Love You
 On parting she spoke
 Over the Fields, the Clean Fields
 The Rendezvous
 The Troika Speeds, the Troika Gallops
You Will Not Believe How Cute You Are

References

Russian composers
Russian male composers
1822 births
1885 deaths
19th-century composers
19th-century male musicians
19th-century musicians